Türk Telekom is a state-owned Turkish telecommunications company. Türk Telekom was separated from Turkish Post (PTT) in 1995.

Türk Telekom Group provides integrated telecommunication services for PSTN, GSM, and wide-band Internet. The Türk Telekom Group companies had 16.8 million PSTN customers, 6 million ADSL customers and 12.1 million GSM customers in September 2009. With its network substructure covering the whole country, the group's companies offer a wide range of services to personal and corporate customers. Türk Telekom, which owns 99.9% of the shares of the companies TTNET, Argela, Innova, Sebit A.Ş. and AssisTT, is also the owner of 81% of the shares of Avea, which is one of the three GSM operators in Turkey. Türk Telekom also supports Albania's Albtelecom. 61.5% of the shares of Turk Telekom belongs to Turkey Wealth Fund, while 30% of the shares belongs to the Ministry of Treasury and Finance (Turkey). The remaining 15% of shares have been offered to the public in Borsa Istanbul.

In July 2018, in the course of the Turkish currency and debt crisis, Turkish and international banks took control of Türk Telekom due to billions of dollars in unpaid debt. Creditors set up a special purpose vehicle to acquire the company as they try to resolve Turkey's biggest-ever debt default.

Between 2011 and 2021, the company was holding the naming rights to Nef Stadium, home to the Galatasaray S.K.

History
1994, February 23, Turkey met with GSM technology. GSM was put into service firstly for its subscribers in Ankara, İstanbul, and İzmir.
1995, April 24, By separating the telecommunication and postal services in PTT from each other, Türk Telekomünikasyon A.Ş. was founded.

1998, April 27, GSM network was transferred to the firms Turkcell and Telsim for 25 years by giving license.
1999, June, asymmetric digital subscriber line (ADSL) was put into service in order to provide high-speed voice and image communication on
2000, Cable Internet applications were started on cable TV.
2001
January 8, Aycell Haberlesme ve Pazarlama Hizmetleri A.S. was founded.
March 21, Iş-TIM Telekomünikasyon Services Inc. started to operate with the commercial name of ARIA
2004
February 19, TT&TIM Communication Services Inc., established by the merger of Türk Telekom's GSM Operator Aycell and İŞ-TİM, was officially founded.
October 15, The commercial name of “TT&TIM Iletisim Hizmetleri A.S.” was changed as “Avea Iletisim Hizmetleri A.S.”
July 22, Türksat A.Ş. was established and started operating separately from Türk Telekom.
2005, November 14, Türk Telekom's privatization was complete and 55% shares of Türk Telekom was sold to Oger Telecom's Joint Venture Group.
2006, September 15, Türk Telekom acquired İŞ-TİM's 40.56% share in Avea for $500 million and Türk Telekom's share in Avea increased to 81.12%.
2008, May 15, The initial public offering for 15% of Türk Telekom shares was completed and the shares started trading on the Istanbul Stock Exchange.
2009, July, Avea launches 3G services.
2018, December 22, Oger Telekom's creditors take control of Türk Telekom due to billions of dollars in unpaid debt.
2022 Turkish Wealth Fund bought %55 of the company, taken back from Oger Telekom.

Subsidiaries

TTNET
TTNET is Turkey's leading Internet service provider and the only company to offer so-called "quadruple play" services (i.e., Internet, TV, voice, and 3G in one). The 2013 Annual Report states that TTNET has 6.3 million subscribers, 620,000 fiber subscribers, and 1.8 million TV subscribers.

It provides ADSL, dial-up, Wi-Fi, G.SHDSL, ATM, Frame Relay, and Metro Ethernet Internet access services to corporate and personal customers in 81 cities in Turkey. TTNET became the first Turkish company to be accepted into the United Nations' "Business Call to Action (BCtA)" program, which seeks to encourage companies to "develop inclusive business models that offer the potential for both commercial success and development impact", for its "Internet 4All initiative".

Innova IT Solutions
Innova Bilişim Çözümleri A.Ş. delivers "solutions" to the institutions in every area, including distribution, finance, and telecommunications. With its services independent from the product and the brand, iNNOVA includes the entire consultancy-design-application development-integration-maintenance value chain.

AssisTT
AssisTT is a customer services and call center company that also provides sales and marketing data. Türk Telekom holds a 100% interest in AssisTT, which was established in November 2007. According to the 2013 Annual Report, as of the end of 2013, there were 115 million incoming calls (an 11% annual increase), which generated 360 million minutes of service time (a 13% annual increase).

AssisTT is Turkey's largest call center and provides its services to other corporations and institutions in addition to its parent company Türk Telekom.

Argela
Argela Software and Information Technologies sells technologies and services for the telecom operators. The 100% of the shares of the company, which had started its activities in 2004, belong to Turk Telekomunikasyon A.S., one of the most important operators in the world. Today, Argela products still are being used by many important operators in six countries. Argela's headquarters are in Istanbul, and has branch offices in Ankara as well as Sunnyvale, California, in the United States.

In 2013, Argela for the first time entered into an industry other than telecommunications by being selected to carry out 4G/LTE Communication System Development (ULAK) Project of Undersecretariat of Defense Industry. In the context of this project, Argela cooperated with ASELSAN and Netaş to domestically develop all hardware and software components of base stations with 4G technology.

AVEA
AVEA, the sole GSM-1800 mobile operator of Turkey, was founded in 2004. Avea, the youngest operator of Turkey, has a nationwide customer base of more than 12.5 million. Offering services to 95.4% of Turkey's population through its next-generation network, the company is growing fast both in the corporate and individual services with the brand "Avea" and constantly investing in technology and infrastructure as well as in its management and 1,981 employees. Having roaming agreements with 516 operators in 189 countries, the company continues to expand its roaming partnerships.
The AVEA brand merged Turk Telekom in 2016

Sebit
The activities of SEBIT Eğitim ve Bilgi Teknolojileri A.Ş. had started in 1988, in a multimedia laboratory founded within Turkey's Scientific and Technological Research Council (TÜBİTAK). The lab was privatized in 1996 and the production of computer supported education contents towards K-12 level. After the product “Akademedia” produced in 1998, Educational software with the brand “Vitamin” had been introduced. In the following years, “KidsPlus” products had joined the series. The company has a place in Chinese, Malaysian, American, and British markets by its unique products in K-12 level.

Plus, it has been conducting the only integrated R&D project in the education area of the European Union’s 6th Framework Program. Active in corporate education, it has developed e-learning solutions for the institutions such as IES, Union of Banks of Turkey, Secretariat of Defense Industries, Public Procurement Agency, Coca-Cola, Migros, Siemens, and TTNET.

CETEL was incorporated by Çalık Enerji and Türk Telekom having 80% and 20% shares, respectively, on 1 June 2007. CETEL purchased the 76% shares of Albtelecom on 1 October 2007. Albtelecom is the incumbent fixed-line operator in Albania which also has a GSM license. Cetel was incorporated as a special-purpose entity in order to acquire the 76% shares of Albtecom Sh.A, which is located Albania and operates in telecommunication industry.

Controversies

Spyware injection
Citizen Lab has found out that a series of middleboxes on Türk Telekom’s network were being used to redirect hundreds of users attempting to download certain legitimate programs to versions of those programs bundled with spyware. The spyware Citizen Lab found bundled by operators was similar to that used in the StrongPity APT attacks. Before switching to the StrongPity spyware, the operators of the Turkey injection used the FinFisher “lawful intercept” spyware, which FinFisher asserts is sold only to government entities.

Organizational structure

Board of Directors
 Ümit Önal, Chairman
 Fuat Oktay, Independent Board Member / Vice Chairman of Board of Directors
 Abdullah Tivnikli, Member of Board of Directors
 Suat Hayri Aka, Member of Board of Directors
 Cenk Serdar, Member of Board of Directors
 Hakam Kanafani, Member of Board of Directors
 Mazen Abou Chakra, Member of Board of Directors
 Nasser Sulaiman A Al Nasser, Member of Board of Directors
 Rami Aslan, Member of Board of Directors
 Fahri Kasırga, Independent Board Member
 İbrahim Eren, Independent Board Member
 Yiğit Bulut, Independent Board Member

Senior management
 Dr. Paul (Boulos H.B.) Doany - chief executive officer 
 Şükrü Kutlu, Human Resources, Regulation and Support Assistant General Manager
 Kaan Aktan, Finance Assistant General Manager
 Cengiz Doğan, Technology Assistant General Manager
 Hakan Dursun, Marketing Assistant General Manager
 Fırat Yaman Er, Strategy, Planning and Business Development Assistant General Manager
 Ümit Önal, Sales and Customer Care Assistant General Manager
 Yakup Öztunç, Legal Assistant General Manager
 Yavuz Türkmen, Head of Internal Audit
 Yavuz Yıldırım, Wholesale Assistant General Manager

See also
Telephone services in Turkey
 Türk Telekom Stadium

References

Telecommunications companies of Turkey
Telecommunications companies established in 1995
Companies based in Ankara
Ministry of Transport and Infrastructure (Turkey)
Turkish companies established in 1995